Goldring is an audio equipment manufacturing company that was established in 1906.  In 1906, the Scharf brothers started manufacturing phonographs in Berlin, Germany. The company moved to England in 1933 and  continued manufacturing cartridges and turntables. The "Juwel Electro Soundbox" phonograph was their own creation and was released in 1926. The Goldring logo was as indication of quality.

In 1954 they released the Goldring 500 magnetic cartridge. This was British made.

Goldring cartridges have been sold in the US since the 1950s and sold all over the world. They range from the budget to high-end. They also sold Swiss-made Lenco turntables in the 1970s. For example, the Lenco L75 was marketed via Goldring as a GL75.

The Scharf brothers changed their name to Sharp and continued their family business until 1987. At this time, Gerry Sharp sold the company to the Goldring distributor, Veda-UK (which is now part of Armour Home).

Even though Goldring were mainly known for their moving coil cartridges and moving magnet cartridges, turntables etc., they also manufactured later sound cones and headphones.

Current moving magnet cartridges
1006
1012GX
1022GX
1024
E1
E2
E3

Current moving iron cartridges
2100
2200
2300
2400
2500

Current moving coil cartridges
Eroica H
Eroica LX
Elite
Legacy  
Ethos

Current headphones
DR50
DR100
DR150
GX100
GX200
NS1000

Goldring timeline
In 1906, the Scharf brothers began manufacturing in Berlin, Germany and released their own phonograph, the Juwel Electro Soundbox, which had a Gold Ring logo to denote quality, in 1926. Goldring moved to England in 1933. In 1954, the company released 500 British-made magnetic cartridges; the 600 and 700 models followed in 1958 and 1960, respectively. The 1970s saw the release of the Lenco GL85 turntable (1973) and of the 900SE II and 900/E cartridges. In 1987, Goldring was sold to Veda-UK (Armour Home Electronics). Between 1987 and 1990, four more cartridges—Eroica, Epic II, Excel, and Elite—were released. In 2004, the Goldring released their digital GR1 turntable followed by the GR2 turntable in 2005. In 2006, they launched their critically acclaimed DR50, DR100, and DR150 headphones.

See also
 List of phonograph manufacturers
 Armour Home Electronics

References

External links
 Goldring.co.uk/history
 6 moons.com
  Goldring G1042 reviewed
 Review of Goldring GX200 Earphones
 Goldring Lenco gallery

Phonograph manufacturers
Audio equipment manufacturers of Germany
Audio equipment manufacturers of the United Kingdom
Manufacturing companies established in 1906
1906 establishments in Germany
1987 mergers and acquisitions